Mian Javed Latif (born 22 February 1964) is a Pakistani politician who has been a member of the National Assembly of Pakistan, since August 2018. Previously, he was a member of the National Assembly  from 2008 to May 2018 and a member of the Provincial Assembly of the Punjab from 1997 to 1999.

Early life
He was born on 22 February 1964.

Political career
Latif ran for the seat of the Provincial Assembly of the Punjab as an independent candidate from Constituency PP-137 (Sheikhupura-IV) in 1993 Pakistani general election but was unsuccessful. He received 26 votes and lost the seat to a candidate of Pakistan Peoples Party (PPP).

Latif was elected to the Provincial Assembly of the Punjab as a candidate of Pakistan Muslim League (N) (PML-N) from Constituency PP-138 (Sheikhupura-V) in 1997 Pakistani general election. He received 14,125 votes and defeated an independent candidate, Javed Bhatti.

Latif was elected to the National Assembly of Pakistan as a candidate of PML-N from Constituency NA-133 (Sheikhupura-II) in 2008 Pakistani general election. He received 44,786 votes and defeated an independent candidate, Chaudhry Muhammad Saeed Virk, a candidate of Pakistan Muslim League (Q). (PML-Q).

He was re-elected to the National Assembly as a candidate of PML-N from Constituency NA-133 (Sheikhupura-II) in 2013 Pakistani general election. He received 68,909 votes and defeated an independent candidate, Chaudhry Muhammad Saeed Virk.

In 2017, a scuffle broke out between Latif and Murad Saeed outside the National Assembly building. Latif reportedly verbally abused female family member of Murad Saeed. Latif later apologized for his remarks against the women family member of Saeed.

He was re-elected to the National Assembly as a candidate of PML-N from Constituency NA-121 (Sheikhupura-III) in 2018 Pakistani general election.

References

Living people
Pakistan Muslim League (N) politicians
Punjabi people
Pakistani MNAs 2013–2018
1964 births
Pakistani MNAs 2008–2013
Punjab MPAs 1997–1999
Pakistani MNAs 2018–2023